Кровь За Кровь (Russian for Blood for Blood; transliterated as Krov' za krov) is the fifth studio album by Russian heavy metal band Aria. It was released in 1991. Krov za krov was the band's first album to be released by a private record label rather than state company Melodia.

Track listing

Lyric themes
 "Farewell Norfolk!" tells of the mythical disappearance of a 1/5 battalion of the Norfolk Regiment in 1915, during the Gallipoli Campaign.
 "Zombie" tells a horror story about a zombie who rises from his grave to avenge his murder.
 "Antichrist" features a view of the Book of Revelation from the devil's point of view. According to several band members, the song was influenced by The Omen horror films franchise. Later Valery Kipelov refused to sing that song at any concerts due to his religious views and fans' wrong understanding of the song.
 "You'd Better Believe Me" is a sequel to "Hero of Asphalt", telling of the deceased biker's post-death experience.
 "Blood for Blood" is about the fate of Pontius Pilate, and is based on the novel The Master and Margarita by Mikhail Bulgakov.
 The song "You'd Better Believe Me" was translated into English and was featured on Aria's compilation album Shtil'.

Personnel
 Valery Kipelov - Vocals
 Vladimir Holstinin - Guitar
 Sergey Mavrin - Guitar
 Vitaly Dubinin - Bass
 Aleksandr Maniakin - Drums
 Ivan Evdokimov - Sound Engineer
 Sergey Ryleev - Sound Engineer
 Yuri Fishkin - Management
 Stas Karyakin - Mastering
 Vasily Gavrilov - Artist
 Aleksandr Gavrilov - Artist
 Konstantin Pylaev - Photography
 Nadir Chanishev - Photography
 Valentin Kudryavtsev - Computer Design

References 

1991 albums
Aria (band) albums